Rovensky District is the name of several administrative and municipal divisions in Russia:
Rovensky District, Belgorod Oblast, an administrative and municipal district of Belgorod Oblast
Rovensky District, Saratov Oblast, an administrative and municipal district of Saratov Oblast

See also
Rovensky (disambiguation)

References